The following is a list of United States counties in which a majority (over 50%) of the population is Native American (American Indian or Alaska Native), according to data from the 2000 Census. The list below is organized by state and the percentage of each county's population that is Native American is listed in parentheses next to the county's name.

There are 28 counties in 9 states with Native American majority populations.

County-equivalents, such as boroughs and census areas in Alaska, are included in this list.

This list does not include Pacific Islanders / Native Hawaiians; in any case, there are no counties with majorities. The highest percentage of Pacific Islanders in any U.S. county is Kalawao County, Hawaii, with 48%, although it only has 82 inhabitants.

By state

Alaska

Bethel Census Area (81.9%)
Dillingham Census Area (70.1%)
Lake and Peninsula Borough (73.5%)
Nome Census Area (75.2%)
North Slope Borough (68.4%)
Northwest Arctic Borough (82.5%)
Kusilvak Census Area (92.5%)
Yukon-Koyukuk Census Area (70.9%)

Arizona
Apache County (76.9%)

Montana
Big Horn County (59.2%)
Glacier County (61.8%)
Roosevelt County (55.8%)

Nebraska
Thurston County (52.0%)

New Mexico
McKinley County (74.7%)

North Dakota
Rolette County (73.0%)
Sioux County (84.6%)

South Dakota

Bennett County (52.1%)
Buffalo County (81.6%)
Corson County (60.8%)
Dewey County (74.2%)
Mellette County (52.4%)
Jackson County (52.0%)
Oglala Lakota County (94.2%)
Todd County (85.6%)
Ziebach County (72.3%)

Utah
San Juan County (55.7%)

Wisconsin
Menominee County (87.3%)

National rankings
Oglala Lakota County (94.20%)
Kusilvak Census Area (92.53%)
Menominee County (87.26%)
Todd County (85.60%)

Gallery

See also
List of U.S. communities with Native American majority populations
Lists of U.S. cities with non-white majority populations

Native American majority populations, counties
Native American-related lists
Native American topics